Lioptilodes neuquenicus is a species of moth in the genus Lioptilodes known from Argentina, Chile, and Peru. Moths of this species take flight in October, November and January and have a wingspan of approximately 14–16 millimetres.

References

Platyptiliini
Moths described in 1991
Taxa named by Cees Gielis